Television Talent is a 1937 British comedy film directed by Robert Edmunds and starring Richard Goolden, Hal Walters and Polly Ward. The film was a quota quickie. The plot concerns a music teacher who takes part in a talent contest.

Cast
 Richard Goolden as Professor Langley 
 Gene Sheldon as Herbert Dingle  
 Hal Walters as Steve Bagley 
 Polly Ward as Mary Hilton

References

Bibliography
Chibnall, Steve. Quota Quickies: The Birth of the British 'B' Film. British Film Institute, 2007.
Low, Rachael. Filmmaking in 1930s Britain. George Allen & Unwin, 1985.
Wood, Linda. British Films, 1927–1939. British Film Institute, 1986.

External links
 

1937 films
1937 comedy films
British comedy films
British black-and-white films
1930s English-language films
1930s British films